Barrowclough is an English surname. Notable people with the surname include:

Anthony Barrowclough (1924–2003), English lawyer
Carl Barrowclough (born 1981), English footballer
Harold Barrowclough (1894–1972), New Zealand general, lawyer and judge
Stewart Barrowclough (born 1951), English footballer

See also
Barraclough

English-language surnames